Matthias Ward (October 13, 1805 – October 5, 1861) was a lawyer and United States Senator from Texas.

Early life
Matthias Ward was born on October 13, 1805, in Elbert County, Georgia. Ward was raised in Madison County, Alabama. He attended an academy in Huntsville, Alabama, taught school and studied law. In 1836 he settled in Bowie, Texas, moving to Clarksville, Texas in 1845 and later to Jefferson, Texas.

Career
Ward served in the seventh and eighth congresses of the Republic of Texas and later in the state senate as a Democrat from 1849 to 1850. This was followed by unsuccessful campaigns for lieutenant governor in 1851 and United States Congress in 1855. In 1855, he ran with a proslavery and states-right campaign against Lemuel D. Evans.

Upon J. Pinckney Henderson’s death in 1858, Ward was appointed to replace him in the United States Senate. He served from September 27, 1858, to December 5, 1859. He failed to secure the nomination to run for the seat in election the next year.

Personal life
Ward died on October 5, 1861, in Warm Springs, North Carolina. He was buried Old Cemetery in Nashville, Tennessee.

References

External links

1805 births
1861 deaths
People from Elbert County, Georgia
People from Madison County, Alabama
People from Bowie, Texas
People from Clarksville, Texas
People from Jefferson, Texas
Democratic Party United States senators from Texas
Democratic Party Texas state senators
19th-century American politicians